The Little Vermilion River may refer to two different rivers in Illinois, in the United States:

* Little Vermilion River (Illinois River)
 Little Vermilion River (Wabash River)